Jean-Christophe Jeauffre (born 26 April 1970) is a French filmmaker, screenwriter and a producer, environmentalist and creator of the Jules Verne International Film Festival.

Education and early career
After graduating in French literature and Conservatoire of Cinema (Paris), he joined the French Navy in 1990 for two years on Aircraft-carrier Foch during the Lebanon war and was in charge of the ship’s Television production unit where he made his first reportages and documentaries for the Navy. In 1991 in Paris, Jeauffre founded the nonprofit Jules Verne Adventures along with Frédéric Dieudonné. Dedicated to exploration, conservation, and education, the organization is now based both in Paris and in Los Angeles.
In 1992, Jeauffre and Dieudonné launched the annual Paris Jules Verne Festival and the Jules Verne Awards, inaugurated by Jacques-Yves Cousteau. This event, also based in Los Angeles, California, is dedicated to exploration, education and conservation. Jeauffre developed a film production unit to create new adventure & exploration programs for theatres and television.

Career

Filmmaking
Jeauffre’s passion for exploration and for the sea led him to conceive scientific expeditions and to create a new concept of documentaries he called Action-documentaries, mixing real-life exploration with fictional content. From 1999 to 2016, Jeauffre wrote, directed and produced several films for TV which include Devil's Islands and Red and White.

A five-month expedition on the Atlantic aboard the tall ship Belem led to his production of the highly acclaimed and award-winning documentaries:
 Whales of Atlantis
 Amazon Trek (2008 Best Feature Documentary Award, White Sands International Film Festival, New Mexico)
 100 Years Under the Sea
 Five Months On The Sea - the Jules Verne Expedition.
Two fully illustrated books were also published after the expedition ( and ).

In 2006, he co-wrote and produced the Jules Verne Adventures TV documentary Explorers: From the Titanic to the Moon, starring producer/director James Cameron and veteran Apollo 11 astronaut Buzz Aldrin.
All of the aforementioned films are now being distributed in the US on DVD and Blu-ray with narrations by Christopher Lee and Ernest Borgnine.

Passage to Mars, his latest film, opened in US theatres, September 30, 2016. Narrated by Zachary Quinto, Charlotte Rampling and Buzz Aldrin, the film was praised by critics (New York Times, The Village Voice, filmdoo, Space.com...) and received Best Picture Awards (REF). It tells the story of a NASA Arctic expedition across the Northwest Passage: the first motorized crossing of the Arctic sea ice aboard prototype humvee Okarian. He co-wrote, produced, directed and edited this feature-length documentary which includes ground-breaking Martian imagery from ESA and NASA.

In 2014, Jeauffre was elected a Fellow of the Explorers Club, based in New York City.

The Jules Verne Festival
In 2005 Dieudonné and Jean-Christophe Jeauffre founded the American version of the French nonprofit Jules Verne Adventures. It is based in Downtown Los Angeles and maintains an IRS 501(c)3 status. The inaugural American launch of the Los Angeles Jules Verne Festival (October 2006 at the Shrine Auditorium) has celebrated the work of George Lucas, Harrison Ford, Dr. Jane Goodall and James Cameron and attracted 6,300 attendees.

The Jules Verne Festival traditionally includes an awards ceremony during which selected explorers, environmentalists, filmmakers and movie stars are presented with the Jules Verne Award. Among others, the Jules Verne Award was given to Gérard Depardieu, Catherine Deneuve, Jean-Pierre Jeunet, Charlotte Rampling, Claude Lelouch, Johnny Depp, Christopher Lee, Patrick Stewart, Mark Hamill, Buzz Aldrin, William Shatner, Tippi Hedren, Stan Lee, Ray Bradbury, Ted Turner, Richard Dean Anderson, Larry Hagman, Christopher Reeve, Roy E. Disney, Tony Curtis, Ernest Borgnine, Steve McQueen, TV series Heroes, Lost, Stargate SG1 and Battlestar Galactica cast and crew, and has celebrated movie classics such as Blade Runner, Star Trek, Superman, Forbidden Planet, Alfred Hitchcock’s The Birds, 2001: A Space Odyssey, Planet of the Apes, Some Like It Hot and The Wild Bunch.

References

External links 
 
  Jules Verne Adventures

1966 births
Living people
French film directors